SOTL can refer to:

 The Silence of the Lambs
 Stars of the Lid
 Scholarship of Teaching and Learning
 Ship of the line
 Spec Ops: The Line
 School of the Legends
 Sister of the Leaf